The 1941 season was the Hawthorn Football Club's 17th season in the Victorian Football League and 40th overall.

Fixture

Lightning Premiership

The VFL held a lightning premiership competition for the second season in a row. The competition was held between rounds 4 and 5

Premiership Season

Ladder

References

Hawthorn Football Club seasons